NCT is a twenty-three-member South Korean boy group under record label SM Entertainment, consisting of four sub-units, NCT U, NCT 127 (Taeil, Johnny, Taeyong, Yuta, Doyoung, Jaehyun, Winwin, Jungwoo, Mark and Haechan), NCT Dream (Mark, Renjun, Jeno, Haechan, Jaemin, Chenle and Jisung) and WayV (Kun, Ten, Winwin, Lucas, Xiaojun, Hendery and Yangyang), and members Shotaro and Sungchan, set to debut in a fifth future sub-unit. In 2016, NCT U debuted with the digital singles "The 7th Sense" and "Without You", which didn't gain immediate commercial success. However, “The 7th Sense” received attention from music critics for its unpredictability and uniqueness, with the platform Melon putting it a number 50 on its list “Top 100 K-pop Songs of All Time”. NCT 127's debut extended play NCT #127 and their following EP Limitless won them several new artist awards during late 2016 to early 2017, including at the 26th Seoul Music Awards and at the 6th Gaon Chart Music Awards. NCT #127 also earned them a nomination for Disc Bonsang at the 31st Golden Disc Awards. NCT Dream's debut digital single “Chewing Gum” and their subsequent single album The First received positive commercial reception.

With the release of their third EP Cherry Bomb, NCT 127 received various nominations, including for Album of the Year at the 8th Gaon Chart Music Awards, for the second quarter, while the lead single of the same name received nominations for Best Pop Song at the 14th Korean Music Awards and for Best Dance Performance — Male Group at the 2018 Mnet Asian Music Awards. NCT Dream's second  EP We Go Up earned them a nomination for Album of the Year at the 9th Gaon Chart Music Awards, for the third quarter. NCT 127's first studio album Regular-Irregular won the group a Disc Bonsang at the 33rd Golden Disc Awards and a Bonsang Award at the 28th Seoul Music Awards . WayV's debut single album The Vision won them Best New Asian Artist at the 2019 Mnet Asian Music Awards. NCT Dream's third EP We Boom won them a Disc Bonsang at the 34th Golden Disc Awards and a Bonsang Award at the 29th Seoul Music Awards.

NCT 127's second studio album Neo Zone earned them various nominations, including for Album of the Year at the 2020 Melon Music Awards, while the album's lead single "Kick It" received a nomination for Best Dance Performance at the 2020 Mnet Asian Music Awards. NCT Dream's lead single for their fourth EP Reload, "Ridin", earned them a nomination for Best Dance Male at the 2020 Melon Music Awards. NCT Dream's first studio album Hot Sauce was commercially successful and won both Best Album Award at the 31st Seoul Music Awards and Album of the Year – 2nd Quarter at the 11th Gaon Chart Music Awards. NCT 127's third studio album Sticker won the group their first Daesang award from a major award show at the 31st Seoul Music Awards and Album of the Year – 4th Quarter at the 11th Gaon Chart Music Awards.

Awards and nominations

Other accolades

State honors

Listicles

See also 
List of awards and nominations received by Taeil
List of awards and nominations received by Doyoung
List of awards and nominations received by Ten
List of awards and nominations received by Mark
List of awards and nominations received by Jaemin
List of awards and nominations received by Chenle

Notes

References 

Awards
NCT